The 1984 Lada Classic was the fifth edition of the professional snooker tournament, which took place from 8–15 January 1984. The tournament was played at the Spectrum Arena, Warrington, Cheshire. This was the first year in which the tournament was held as a ranking event. Television coverage was on ITV.

Rex Williams made a total clearance of 143 in the seventh frame of his match against Tony Meo, but lost the match 3–5. Williams won the high break prize of £1,000.

Steve Davis won his third Classic title beating fellow Londoner Tony Meo by 9–8. Meo led 4–2 before Davis won the last frame of the afternoon session with a break of 122 and then four more frames in a row in the evening to lead 7–4. Meo then won the next four frames to lead 8–7 before Davis levelled the match at 8–8 with a break of 84. With only the colours left in the deciding frame and Meo lined up on the yellow, a spectator yelled out "Come on, Tony!". Although Meo took time to compose himself after the shout, he missed the yellow and a few shots later Davis the frame after potting the final pink.

Main draw

Final

Qualifying
The final qualifying round was played in Warrington in November 1983.

Final qualifying round

Century breaks
(Including qualifying rounds)

143, 105  Rex Williams
125  Mario Morra
122  Steve Davis
111  Silvino Francisco
104  Jimmy White
102  John Parrott
102  Ray Reardon

References

Classic (snooker)
Classic
Classic
Classic
Sport in Warrington